The Nude Dancer (French: La danseuse nue) is a 1952 French comedy film directed by Pierre-Louis and starring Catherine Erard, Pierre Larquey and Jean Debucourt. The film's sets were designed by the art director Claude Bouxin. It is based on the interwar career of music hall star Colette Andris.

Synopsis
A student gives up her studies and becomes a cabaret dancer leading to her fiancee breaking off their engagement. She marries an older man who helps her career by buying a nightclub.

Cast
 Catherine Erard as Colette Andris
 Pierre Larquey as 	Charmois
 Jean Debucourt as Gilbert Chantal
 Raymond Bussières as 	Saulnier
 Luce Aubertin as 	Tania
 Gaby Basset as 	Justine
 Alexandre Dréan as 	Gallus
 Édith Georges as 	Peggy
 Elisa Lamotte as 	Thérèse 
 Nicole Lemaire as 	La speakerine
 Michel Nastorg as 	Michel
 Philippe Olive as 	Pépère
 Pierre-Louis as 	René Laporte
 Robert Pizani as Grégor

References

Bibliography
 Bessy, Maurice & Chirat, Raymond. Histoire du cinéma français: 1951-1955. Pygmalion, 1989.

External links 
 

1952 films
French comedy films
1950s French-language films
1952 comedy films
Films set in Paris
1950s French films